Cannibal Ferox, also known as Make Them Die Slowly in the US and as Woman from Deep River in Australia, is a 1981 Italian cannibal exploitation horror film written and directed by Umberto Lenzi. Upon its release, the film's US distributor claimed it was "the most violent film ever made". Cannibal Ferox was also claimed to be "banned in 31 countries", although this claim is dubious. The title derives from the Latin ferox, meaning cruel, wild or ferocious.

Plot
In Colombia, siblings Rudy and Gloria and their friend Pat prepare for a journey into the rainforest. They plan to prove Gloria's theory that cannibalism is a myth. The trio encounters a drug dealer named Mike and his business partner Joe. Joe is badly wounded; Mike explains that cannibals attacked them. Gloria goes missing during the night, and Rudy finds a native village while looking for her.

Due to Joe's injuries, the travelers decide to stay in the nearly deserted village. Mike seduces the naive Pat. In a cocaine-fueled rage, he encourages Pat to kill a native girl. She is unable to do it, so Mike kills the girl himself. In his dying moments, Joe reveals that he and Mike were responsible for the cannibals' aggression. They came to the region to exploit the natives for emeralds and cocaine, taking advantage of their trust in white men. One day, while high on cocaine, Mike brutally tortured and killed their native guide in full view of the tribe. A badly charred body, previously believed to be that of a different guide, is actually this native. Mike kidnapped a native girl to lead them out of the jungle, but the outsiders were followed and attacked.

After the murder of the native girl, the cannibals finally snap and hunt the outsiders. Joe dies of his wounds, and his body is found and cannibalized by the natives in full view of Rudy and Gloria, hiding from the natives. Mike and Pat abandon the others, but all are captured by the natives and forced into a cage. The prisoners are forced to watch Mike as he is tortured, beaten, including having his penis sliced off with a large machete-like knife and then eaten by a native villager. The natives transport their prisoners to another village, but Rudy manages to escape. He is caught in a booby trap in the jungle, and his bleeding wounds attract piranhas. He begs the natives to help him. The natives shoot him with a poisoned dart, and he dies instantly in front of everyone.

Pat and Gloria are put in a hole in the ground. Mike is placed in a separate cage. A native man, whom Pat had saved from Mike's aggression, lowers a rope into the hole so the women can escape. Mike digs his way out of the cage, chases the man away, and cuts the rope, preventing the women from escaping. Mike flees into the jungle, where he tries to attract the attention of a search and rescue plane, but he is recaptured. The natives sever one of his hands and drag him back to the village. The search plane lands, but the natives tell the rescuers that the outsiders' canoe capsized in the river and crocodiles ate them.

As the search team leaves, Pat is bound, stripped to the waist, and the natives run hooks through her breasts to be hung by them. Gloria can only watch as Pat dies a slow and painful death. Meanwhile, Mike's head is locked in a crude contraption, and the top of his skull is cut off so that the natives can eat his exposed brain. During the night, the sympathetic native returns and frees Gloria. He guides her through the jungle but falls victim to one of the natives' booby traps. Gloria eventually encounters a pair of trappers, who take her to safety. Instead of telling the true story, she recounts the natives' lie about the others being eaten by crocodiles.

Gloria, deeply disturbed by her experiences, returns to civilization. She publishes a book titled, Cannibalism: End of a Myth, which lies to support her theory and covers up the events of her ordeal.

Cast
 Giovanni Lombardo Radice (as John Morghen) as Mike Logan 
 Frank von Kuegelgen  as Mike Logan 
 Lorraine De Selle as Gloria Davis
 Pat Starke as Gloria Davis 
 Danilo Mattei (as Bryan Redford) as Rudy Davis 
 Gregory Snegoff as Rudy Davis 
 Zora Kerova (as Zora Kerowa) as Pat Johnson
 Walter Lucchini (as Walter Lloyd) as Joe Costolani 
 Andy Luotto as Joe Costolani 
 Robert Kerman as Lt. Rizzo
 Edward Mannix as Lt. Rizzo 
 Fiamma Maglione (as Meg Fleming) as Myrna Stenn 
 Susan Spafford as Myrna Stenn 
 John Bartha as Brooklyn Mobster
 Richard McNamara as Brooklyn Mobster 
 Venantino Venantini as Sgt. Ross
 Lewis E. Ciannelli as Sgt. Ross 
 'El Indio' Rincon as Juanito
 Dominic Raacke as Tim Barrett 
 Steven Luotto as Tim Barrett 
 Perry Pirkanen as Paul 
 Larry Dolgin as Paul

Release
Cannibal Ferox was released in Italy on April 24, 1981.

Cannibal Ferox was released uncut on video in the United Kingdom circa 1982 by Replay, but the film's transgressive imagery and scenes of real animal torture and slaughter resulted in the film promptly being banned under the Obscene Publications Act, finding itself languishing for years on the video nasties list. Early DVD versions, available in the UK were missing around six minutes of footage (chiefly of graphic violence and animal cruelty), which was cut before being given to the BBFC for a rating. The full version of the film was submitted to the board in 2018, and again received 2 minutes of cuts to the animal violence.

In Australia, where it was released as Woman from Deep River, the film also faced censorship issues, being given numerous censored releases. In 2005, the uncut version was released on DVD by Siren Visual under the Cannibal Ferox title.

In the United States, Cannibal Ferox'''s (a.k.a. Make Them Die Slowly) "original, uncensored director's cut" was released by Grindhouse Releasing in the late 1990s. Grindhouse is still the sole official licensed distributor of the film in North America. On May 22, 2015, Grindhouse released the film in a 3 Disc Blu-ray/DVD feature, the film's first time on Blu-ray Disc. The Blu-ray featured the documentary film Eaten Alive! The Rise and Fall of the Italian Cannibal Film'' and a 12-page booklet.

Critical reception

On Rotten Tomatoes, the film has a 40% approval rating, based on five reviews. AllMovie called the film "revolting," but "nauseatingly effective," though noting that it is "primarily a showcase for the gory special-effects artistry of Gianetto de Rossi".  Some critics criticized the film for its depictions of animal abuse, the poor acting and lines, and sexism.

See also
 Cannibal film
 Video nasty

References

External links
 
 
 Interview with exploitation film distributor Bob Murawski of Grindhouse Releasing
 Cannibal Ferox DVD release information
 Make Them Die Slowly trailer download at the Internet Archive
 Cannibal Ferox Soundtrack on Discogs
 Cannibal Ferox Soundtrack on One Way Static Records

1981 films
1981 horror films
1980s adventure films
Italian adventure films
Italian horror films
1980s Italian-language films
1980s Spanish-language films
Films directed by Umberto Lenzi
Cannibal-boom films
Films set in Brazil
Films set in New York City
Obscenity controversies in film
Italian splatter films
Films produced by Luciano Martino
Video nasties
1980s exploitation films
1981 multilingual films
Italian multilingual films
1980s Italian films